Awakening(s) may refer to:

 Wakefulness, the state of being conscious

Religion
 Awakening (Finnish religious movement), a Lutheran movement in Finland
 Great Awakening, several periods of Anglo-American Christian revival
 Bodhi (awakening), a form of Buddhist spiritual enlightenment
 Spiritual awakening, a religious experience

Film and television

Film
 Awakening (1959 film), a Czechoslovak film starring Josef Kemr
 Awakening (1981 film), a Chinese film starring Joan Chen
 Awakenings, a 1990 film directed by Penny Marshall, adapted from the book by Oliver Sacks (see below)
 Awakening (1992 film) or Mary from Beijing, a Hong Kong film
 Awakening (2013 film), a Nigerian thriller

Television episodes
 "Awakening" (Angel)
 "Awakening" (The Outer Limits)
 "Awakening" (Sanctuary)
 "Awakening" (Star Trek: Enterprise)
 "Awakening" (Stargate Universe)
 "Awakenings" (Devious Maids)

Literature
 Awakening (comics), a number of titles
 Awakening (book), a 2017 non-fiction book by Nathaniel Frank
 Awakenings (book), a 1990 non-fiction book by Oliver Sacks
 Awakening, a 2008 novella by Judith Berman
 Awakening, a Sweep novel by Cate Tiernan
 Awakening, the U.S. title of Les Mal Partis, a 1950 novel by Sébastien Japrisot
 Awakening, a young adult novel by Robin Wasserman in the Chasing Yesterday series

Music
 Awakening Music, a label specializing in Islamic music
 Awakenings (festival), techno music events held in the Netherlands

Classical
 Awakening, a 2005 composition for string orchestra by Behzad Ranjbaran
 Awakenings, a 1991 composition for solo harp by Barry Conyngham

Albums
 Awakening (Blessthefall album) or the title song, 2011
 Awakening (Iris album), 2003
 Awakening (Jackie Evancho album), 2014
 Awakening (Narada Michael Walden album) or the title song, 1979
 Awakening (Narnia album) or the title song, 1998
 Awakening (Nicole Mitchell album) or the title song, 2011
 Awakening (Promise album), 2011
 Awakening (Sacred Reich album) or the title song, 2019
 Awakening (Sebalter album) or the title song, 2017
 Awakening (Sonny Fortune album) or the title song, 1975
 Awakening!!, by Jimmy Woods, or the title song, 1962
 Passion: Awakening, recorded live at Passion Conferences 2010, or the title song
 Awakening, by Color Me Badd, 1998

Songs
 "Awakening" (song), by Switchfoot, 2007
 "Awakening", by the Absence from Riders of the Plague, 2007
 "Awakening", by Aurora, 2013
 "Awakening", by Empire of the Sun from Ice on the Dune, 2013
 "Awakening", by Ravi Shankar from Shankar Family & Friends, 1974
 "Awakening", by the Script from Freedom Child, 2017
 "Awakening", from the Final Fantasy XI video game soundtrack, 2002
 "Awakenings", by Symphony X from The Odyssey, 2002

Other uses
 Awakening (political party), a Latvian right-wing party
 Awakening Foundation, a Taiwanese feminist organization
 Awakening (video game series), a 2010–2014 series of casual puzzle adventure games
 Awakenings: New Magic in 2057, a 1995 role-playing game supplement for Shadowrun

See also
 The Awakening (disambiguation)
 
 Awake (disambiguation)
 Awaken (disambiguation)
 Enlightenment (spiritual)
 National awakening (disambiguation)
 Romantic nationalism